The Shia insurgency in Bahrain is an ongoing insurgency by Shia militant groups, supported by Iran, to topple the Sunni minority government of Bahrain.

History

Timeline

2011
The insurgency began in 2011, with the start of the Bahraini uprising of 2011.

2012
On 10 April 2012, a bomb attack injured Seven policemen in Akr.
On 5 November 2012, at least five homemade bombs exploded in the nation's capital, killing 2 Asian workers and injuring another.

2013
On 12 July 2013, a home-made bomb wounded Bahraini policemen outside the Shiite village, according to the interior ministry. State-media claimed it was "planted by terrorists" near the capital, Manama.

2014
On 15 February 2014, one policeman was killed in a bombing.
On 3 March 2014, three policeman were killed in a bombing by Al-Ashtar Brigades, including an Emirati officer.
On 19 April 2014, two men were killed and another injured after their car exploded. They were suspected to be militants transporting explosives.
On 5 July 2014, policeman Mahmud Farid was killed in a bombing in Eker village.

2015
On 28 July 2015, a bomb killed two policemen and wounded six in Sitra.

2016 
On 30 June 2016, 1 person was killed and 3 injured after a roadside bombing. 2 people were arrested who were suspected of planting the bomb. Bahrain accused Iran's Revolutionary Guards for being behind the bombing, although this is only an accusation, and does not rule out the possibility of terrorism. U.S. Vice President Joe Biden expressed his concerns after the attack. The bombing was described as a "terrorist bombing". 
On 1 July 2016, one woman was killed and three children injured in a bombing.

2017
On 1 January 2017, one policeman was killed and a second injured in a jailbreak conducted by four-six armed men at Jaww prison. 10 inmates convicted of terrorist offenses escaped.
On 15 January 2017, three militants (Abbas al-Samea, Sami Mushaima and Ali al-Singace) were executed for the 3 March 2014 bombing.
On 29 January 2017, a police officer in Bahrain was shot dead in an attack claimed by a Shi'ite militant group.
On 18 June 2017, a member of the security forces was killed and two others were wounded after a bombing in Diraz.
On June 19, a Shia militant accidentally blew himself up with an improvised explosive device.
In June 2017, Saraya al-Mukhtar performs a cyberattack on a former government official's Twitter account.
On 2 October 2017, five policemen were injured in a bombing in the village of Daih on Budaiya road.
On 27 October 2017, one policeman was killed and eight wounded in a bombing of a bus near the Jidhafs area.
On 10 November 2017, a bomb caused a fire at Bahrain’s main pipeline near Buri village.

2018
On 7 February 2018, four members of the cell behind the bomb attack on the oil pipeline were arrested.
On 3 March 2018, 116 militants who were part of cells established by the Islamic Revolutionary Guard Corps were arrested.

2019
On 27 July 2019, two alleged militants were executed by the state on charges of terrorism. Both were allegedly involved in the January 1, 2017 killing of a prison guard that helped let 10 detainees escape, as well as the for the killings of two other police officers that month. The two were arrested in February 2017.

2020
On 15 December 2020, the United States Treasury added the Saraya Al-Mukhtar (aka. Bahraini Islamic Resistance, aka. Al-Mukhtar Brigades, etc.) to the Specially Designated Nationals list, subjecting it to economic sanctions imposed by the United States. The sanctions were imposed due to their connections with Iran.

2021
In November the Bahraini government says it has foiled an attempted attack by insurgents.

2022

References

Rebellions in Bahrain
2010s conflicts
2020s conflicts
2010s in Bahrain
2020s in Bahrain
Conflicts in 2011
Conflicts in 2012
Conflicts in 2013
Conflicts in 2014
Conflicts in 2015
Conflicts in 2016
Conflicts in 2017
Conflicts in 2018
Conflicts in 2019
Conflicts in 2020
Conflicts in 2021
2011 in Bahrain
2012 in Bahrain
2013 in Bahrain
2014 in Bahrain
2015 in Bahrain
2016 in Bahrain
2017 in Bahrain
2018 in Bahrain
2019 in Bahrain
2020 in Bahrain
2021 in Bahrain
Wars involving Bahrain
Shia–Sunni sectarian violence
Bahrain–Iran relations
Iran–Saudi Arabia relations
Iran–Saudi Arabia proxy conflict